The Old Gold Rugby Football Club is a rugby union team based in Boston, Massachusetts, USA. The club competes in, and is governed by, the New England Rugby Football Union, the Northeast Rugby Union, and USA Rugby. The team currently fields sides in Division II and Division IV in NERFU.

Old Gold Rugby Football Club was founded in Boston, Massachusetts by a group of Boston College Alumni and has competed in New England and toured the globe since it was founded in the Fall of 1974.

History

Old Gold Rugby Football Club was founded in Boston, Massachusetts by a group of Boston College Alumni and has competed in New England and toured the globe since it was founded in the Fall of 1974. The team is steeped with history and tradition.

During that first season Old Gold was undefeated, and has ever since continued to offer competitive rugby to any team who steps onto the field. The team plays fair and hard rugby that have earned it a solid reputation in NERFU. Old Gold also helps foster rugby by helping out at college level and by offering a very well run tournament the New England 10’s.

Each fall Old Gold competes in the NERFU League against clubs throughout New England and New York. Old Gold fields teams in the Second and Fourth Divisions. Old Gold has won the Second Division of New England a number of times.

Old Gold is the home for many players from around the world. Its current list boasts players from countries such as Australia, Tonga, South Africa, England, Ireland, Canada and more.

Old Gold has an extensive history of tours. Within the United States, the club annually plays in one of the nation's greatest tournaments, the Saranac Lake Can-Am Rugby Tournament. Other tournaments include Savannah, Georgia, St. Patrick's Day Tournament, the Connecticut Cup, Portland Tournament, the Harvard, Newport, New York and Worcester 7's, and the New England 10's.

Old Gold celebrated its 25th anniversary in 2000 with a tour of the Bahamas Islands. Prior to that, in ‘96 it toured the Grand Cayman Islands. Its 20th Anniversary tour landed was in Australia ‘94. Other tours include England/Wales ‘91, Ireland/Scotland ‘87, Bahamas ‘83. Also, a few members traveled to South Africa for the 1995 World Cup and were able to attend the Championship Match between South Africa and New Zealand.

References

External links
 

1974 establishments in Massachusetts
Rugby clubs established in 1974
Rugby union teams in Boston
South Boston